The Apenke is a left tributary of the Söse in Osterode in the Harz Mountains in the German state of Lower Saxony.

Course 
The Apenke rises south of the Feenhöhe heights in the Bärengarten. It flows initially parallel to the Eipenke stream in a southwesterly direction. Near Augustental it is joined by more water draining from the Teufelsbäder moor. For the rest of its course the Apenke flows northwest and feeds the ponds of Kaiserteich and Pferdeteich. In the Osterode town district of Petershütte it empties into the Söse.

History 
The water power of the Apenke used to be used to drive the various water wheels for gypsum, corn and saw mills.

The following is a translation of the verses (rhyming in the original German) written by Manfred Kleiner about the Apenke:

Pure and clear all silvery bright, is the Apenke's little spring on the Harz's western rim, where I found the little beck's source. There, where the stream begins its sally, where the water runs down the valley, under trees and hidden well still untainted, the Apenke murmurs quietly, wanting to reach Osterode. Happy to escape the dark forest it helps to refresh the meadows and fills along its way pond after pond with water. This habitat for fish also helps to refresh the sheep and is, as is clear to anyone, the home of a huge flock of ducks. Half hidden, to the side of paths it flows gently through the terrain, its water keeping gardens looked after, it only has to be nimbly scooped up. At the Apenke's mouth at last has the Apenke reached its end, it gives its water without complaining to the millstream and its continuation.

See also 
List of rivers of Lower Saxony

References 

Rivers of Lower Saxony
Rivers of the Harz
Osterode (district)
Rivers of Germany